Azohydromonas lata is a gram-negative, hydrogen-using bacterium from the genus Azohydromonas. Alcaligenes latus has been reclassified as Azohydromonas lata.

References

External links 

Type strain of Azohydromonas lata at BacDive -  the Bacterial Diversity Metadatabase

Burkholderiales
Bacteria described in 1978